The Bybee House is a historic house in Glasgow, Kentucky. It was built for William Bybee, "a farmer, livestock trader and land speculator" in 1855, six years before the start of the American Civil War. and it was designed in the Classical Revival architectural style. It has been listed on the National Register of Historic Places since August 6, 2012.

References

National Register of Historic Places in Barren County, Kentucky
Neoclassical architecture in Kentucky
Houses completed in 1855
1855 establishments in Kentucky
Glasgow, Kentucky
Houses in Barren County, Kentucky